Aechmea pubescens is a species of flowering plant in the Bromeliaceae family. This species is native to Costa Rica, Honduras, Nicaragua, Panama, Colombia and Venezuela.

References

pubescens
Flora of Central America
Flora of South America
Plants described in 1879
Taxa named by John Gilbert Baker